Plectrura metallica is a species of beetle in the family Cerambycidae. It was described by Henry Walter Bates in 1884. It is known from Japan, China, Taiwan, North Korea, South Korea, and Russia.

Subspecies
 Plectrura metallica metallica (Bates, 1884)
 Plectrura metallica yoshihiroi Takakuwa, 1984

References

Morimopsini
Beetles described in 1884